Cybergeddon (from tech. cyber-, lit. "computer"; Hebrew: Megiddo, extracted from Har Megiddo ("mountain of final battle")) refers to cataclysm resulting from a large-scale sabotage of all computerized networks, systems and activities. It combines cyberterrorism, cyberwarfare, cybercrime, and hacktivism into scenarios of wide-scale internet disruption or economic collapse.  Economic or industrial infrastructure could be targeted, such as banks or industrial control systems.  Since 2012, the number of Internet-based attacks and their complexity has increased.

"Cybergeddon is a possibility," FireEye CEO Ashar Aziz explained in an interview with Bloomberg:  "Attacks on critical infrastructures such as the power grid or financial institutions could wreak havoc not just on United States economy, but in fact, the world economy."

The Defense Technical Information Center cited nuclear electromagnetic pulse attacks as a part of the military action that may bring about cybergeddon.

References

Doomsday scenarios
Internet security